Oshrat Eni (born ) is an Israeli football defender, currently playing for Hapoel Tel Aviv. She was a member of the Israeli national team, since making her debut in 2007, against Austria. Eni played with both Hapoel Tel Aviv and Maccabi Holon at UEFA Women's Cup, playing a total of 24 matches.

Club career
Eni had played in the Israeli First League since 1999, first appearing for Hapoel Tel Aviv, where she had played until 2002 and won the double in 2001. When the team folded, Eni moved to Maccabi Holon where she played, with the exception of two months tenure at Bnot Hadar Yosef, until 2010. With Holon Eni had won 6 league championships and 7 cups.

In March 2010 Eni transferred to Maccabi Be'er Sheva, where she stayed for the next two seasons, leading the club to its best league position, 4th and the cup final. Later Eni played for Ligat Nashim clubs Maccabi Kishronot Hadera and F.C. Ramat HaSharon.

In September 2014 Eni signed with Anderlecht. However, the deal collapsed and Eni returned to play for F.C. Ramat HaSharon.

International career
Eni made her debut for the Israel women's national football team in 2007 against Estonia and so far played 11 matches for the national team. Eni had also played for the U-19 national team, making 8 appearances between 2001 and 2002

Off-field activity
Eni is active on behalf of Athena Israel, an organization set to promote women sport in Israel, giving lectures at schools. Eni holds a Bachelor of Arts degree in Physical Education, and had also dabbled in politics, running for the Herzliya city council in the 2013 elections.

Honours
Championships (7):
With Hapoel Tel Aviv: 2000–01
With Maccabi Holon: 2002–03, 2004–05, 2005–06, 2006–07, 2007–08, 2008–09
Cup (8):
With Hapoel Tel Aviv: 2000–01
With Maccabi Holon: 2002–03, 2003–04, 2004–05, 2005–06, 2006–07, 2007–08, 2008–09

References

1984 births
Israeli Jews
Living people
Israeli women's footballers
Israel women's international footballers
Hapoel Tel Aviv F.C. (women) players
Maccabi Holon F.C. (women) players
Bnot Hadar Yosef Tel Aviv F.C. players
Maccabi Be'er Sheva F.C. (women) players
Maccabi Kishronot Hadera F.C. players
F.C. Ramat HaSharon players
Women's association football defenders
Footballers from Kfar Saba